Mastology may refer to:
 the study of the human breast and related illnesses
 Mammalogy, the subset of zoology that studies mammals